"I'm the One Who Really Loves You" Is a track included on F.L.M., the first album by British pop act Mel and Kim. Although never released internationally as a single, after being subjected to a handful of remixes by Clivillés & Cole and a limited North American release, it reached number eleven on the Hot Dance Club chart.

It was originally recorded and released by British singer Austin Howard in 1986. Both versions were written and produced by Stock Aitken Waterman.

Releases
Album version 3:40

US mix 6:47 — by Pete Hammond; included as a B-side on most 12" and CD single versions of "That's the Way It Is"

US 7" (Atlantic 89180)
 Pop Radio mix 3:45
 Hip Hop Radio mix
US 12" (Atlantic 0-86627)
 Stardom Groove Club mix 5:55
 Groove dub 5:40
 Kick 'N Live mix 6:46
 Done Properly dub 6:06

US 12" promo (Atlantic DMD 1124)
 Stardom Groove Club mix 5:55
 Groove dub 5:40
 Pop Radio mix 3:45
 Kick 'N Live mix 6:46
 Done Properly dub 6:06

Austin Howard version
7" (TEN 97)
 7” version 3:35
 Instrumental 3:34
12" (TEN 97-12)
 Extended version 6:55
 7” version 3:35
 Instrumental 3:34
12" remix (TENT 97-12)
 Extended remix 7:39
 Extended version 6:55

1987 singles
Mel and Kim songs
Songs written by Mike Stock (musician)
Songs written by Matt Aitken
Songs written by Pete Waterman
Song recordings produced by Stock Aitken Waterman
1987 songs